John DeGroff is a Christian musician.

DeGroff was one of the original members of Christian rock band Petra in 1972, along with Greg Hough, Bill Glover and Bob Hartman. He played bass guitar on the band's first two records (Petra and Come and Join Us) before leaving in 1979. Petra has been inducted into the Christian Music Hall of Fame (2007), the Gospel Music Hall of Fame (2000), and the Hard Rock Cafe (1994).

After leaving Petra, DeGroff played in several bands in the Fort Wayne area, and also did some session work. In 1987, he moved to Nashville, Tennessee and dedicated himself to songwriting and other musical activities. He has had some songs recorded on independent records and does some occasional studio work. He recorded with the band, Cosmonaut Bob, in 2002 and can be heard on their Return From Reality album.

Also in 2003, DeGroff joined Hough and Glover in a project called GHF (God Has Forgiven).

John has joined original members of Petra for several reunions.

June 12, 2004: Oakhill Family Campground - Angola, IN (DeGroff, Hough and Hartman)
Setlist:
Walkin' in the Light
Get Back to the Bible
I'm Not Ashamed
Lucas McGraw
Storm Comin'
Backslidin' Blues
Rockin' On With Jesus

November 12, 2005: Petra Farewell Tour - First Assembly of God - Ft. Wayne, IN.  (DeGroff, Glover, Hough and Hartman)
Setlist:
Walkin' in the Light
Without You I Would Surely Die
Storm Comin'

November 19, 2005: Petra Farewell Tour - Mark Price Arena - Enid, OK (DeGroff, Glover, Hough and Hartman)

August 20, 2022: Buck Lake Ranch - Angola, IN  (DeGroff, Glover, Hough and Hartman)
Get Back to the Bible

DeGroff released a progressive rock solo album, SALT, in 2018.John Schlitt sings on some of the tracks. Salt 2, Trophy Hunting for Unicorns was released in late 2020. It features guest appearances from John Schlitt, Greg Hough, and Shawn Browning.

DeGroff is also a freelance music journalist and has written articles in several music magazines, periodicals, and online sites (clashdaily.com).

John DeGroff had two children with former wife Lynnette Stanley (nee Fry). DeGroff married Jennifer Savage in 2006; the couple currently resides in Indiana and are active in music ministry in their church.

References

External links
GHF Band

Petra (band) members
Music journalists
Living people
Year of birth missing (living people)